The Men's 50 Butterfly event at the 11th FINA World Aquatics Championships swam 26–-27 July 2005 in Montreal, Canada. Preliminary and Semifinal heats swam on 26 July, with the Final on 27 July.

Prior to the competition, the existing World (WR) and Championship (CR) records were:
WR: 23.30 swum by Ian Crocker (United States) on 29 Feb 2004 in Swimming at the 2004 Big 12 Time Trials, Austin, United States.
CR: 23.43 swum by Matt Welsh (Australia) on 21 Jul 2003 in Swimming at the 2003 FINA World Aquatic Championships Barcelona, Spain.

Results

Final

Semifinals

Preliminaries

Swim-off for 16th
Results from the swim-off for 16th place, between Milorad Cavic and Kaio Almeida were:
 24.02 - Milorad Cavic (Serbia & Montenegro)
 24.22 - Kaio Almeida (Brazil)

References

Men's 50 metre butterfly
Swimming at the 2005 World Aquatics Championships